Azizabad (also Romanized as ‘Azīzābād) is a village in Suri Rural District, Suri District, Rumeshkhan County, Lorestan Province, Iran. At the 2006 census, its population was 626, in 130 families.

References 

Populated places in Rumeshkhan County